Yan Zi (Chinese: 燕姿) is the debut album by Singaporean singer Stefanie Sun, released on 9 June 2000 by Warner Music Taiwan. The songs, "Love Document" and "Cloudy Day", reached number 4 and 33 respectively on the Hit FM Annual Top 100 Singles in 2000. The album earned Sun a Golden Melody Award for Best New Artist.

Track listing
 "超快感" (Turbo) – 3:39
 "愛情證書" (Love Document) – 4:14
 "天黑黑" (Cloudy Day) – 3:56
 "E-Lover" – 4:59
 "濃眉毛" (Sculpted Eyebrow) – 3:47
 "和平" (Make Peace) – 4:08
 "自然" (Natural) – 3:24
 "終於" (Finally) – 3:56
 "很好" (Fine) – 4:27
 "Leave Me Alone" – 4:26

References

2004 albums
Stefanie Sun albums
Warner Music Taiwan albums